Caripeta triangulata is a species of moth in the family Geometridae first described by William Barnes and James Halliday McDunnough in 1916. It is found in Central and North America.

The MONA or Hodges number for Caripeta triangulata is 6957.

References

Further reading

 
 

Ourapterygini
Articles created by Qbugbot
Moths described in 1916